The 1922 Ohio State Buckeyes football team represented Ohio State University in the 1922 Big Ten Conference football season. The Buckeyes compiled a 3–4 record, only their second losing record in conference play. Ohio State was outscored 57–42 during the season.

Schedule

Coaching staff
 John Wilce, head coach, 10th year

References

Ohio State
Ohio State Buckeyes football seasons
Ohio State Buckeyes football